General Sir Robert Cyril Ford  (29 December 1923 – 24 November 2015) was a British Army general who was Adjutant-General to the Forces. The Bloody Sunday shootings occurred during his tenure as Commander Land Forces, Northern Ireland.

Early career
Born in Devon to John and Gladys Ford, Robert Ford was educated at Musgrave's College and received an emergency commission in the Royal Armoured Corps in 1943. He served in North West Europe during World War II and was mentioned in despatches. He was appointed to a permanent commission with the substantive rank of lieutenant on 29 June 1946. He was appointed a lieutenant in the 4th/7th Royal Dragoon Guards on 1 February 1947 and was deployed to Palestine during the Palestine Emergency the same year, where as a temporary captain he was again mentioned in despatches in 1948. He was promoted to captain on 29 December 1950 and to major on 29 December 1957.

Ford was brevetted to lieutenant-colonel on 1 July 1962 and promoted to substantive lieutenant-colonel on 4 February 1966. He became Commanding Officer of 4th/7th Royal Dragoon Guards the same year. Skipping one rank, he was promoted to brigadier on 31 December 1967 and appointed Commander of 7th Armoured Brigade in 1968.

Northern Ireland and Bloody Sunday
On 29 July 1971, at the height of the Troubles, Brigadier Ford was appointed Commander Land Forces, Northern Ireland, with the acting rank of major-general, and was promoted to the substantive rank on 29 August. He was criticised in the Saville Report into the Bloody Sunday massacre in Derry for deploying soldiers to arrest rioters: "In our view his decision to use 1 Para as the arrest force is open to criticism but he did not know his decision would result in soldiers firing unjustifiably."

In the secret memo to his superior, dated 7 January 1972, Ford said he was "coming to the conclusion that the minimum force necessary to achieve a restoration of law and order is to shoot selected ringleaders amongst the DYH (Derry Young Hooligans), after clear warnings have been issued". In the event, seven of the innocent victims of Bloody Sunday were indeed Derry teenagers. At the Bloody Sunday inquiry he claimed not to remember having written the memo. Ford relinquished his command on 9 April 1973.

Later career
In 1973, Ford became Commandant of the Royal Military Academy Sandhurst, and in 1976 he was appointed Military Secretary. He was Adjutant General from 1978 to 1981 when he retired from the British Army.

He was ADC General to the Queen from 1980 to 1981.

He was awarded the CB in 1973, the KCB in 1977 and the GCB in 1981. He was also awarded the MBE in 1958 and the CBE in 1971.

Retirement
In retirement he was Chairman of the Army Benevolent Fund from 1981 to 1987. He was also Governor of the Royal Hospital Chelsea from 1981 to 1987. He served as Vice-Chairman of the Commonwealth War Graves Commission from 1989 to 1993. He died on 24 November 2015.

Family
In 1949, Ford married Jean Claudia Pendlebury (died 2002) and they had a son. He married Caroline Margaret Peerless (née Leather) in 2003.

References

External links
British Army Officers 1939−1945

|-
 

|-
 

|-

|-

1923 births
2015 deaths
4th/7th Royal Dragoon Guards officers
British Army generals
British military personnel of the Palestine Emergency
British military personnel of The Troubles (Northern Ireland)
British Army personnel of World War II
Commandants of Sandhurst
Commanders of the Order of the British Empire
Graduates of the Royal Military College, Sandhurst
Graduates of the Staff College, Camberley
Knights Grand Cross of the Order of the Bath
People from South Hams (district)
Military personnel from Devon
Royal Armoured Corps officers